Guara rhaphis is the only species in the monotypic moth genus Guara of the family Geometridae. It is found in Chile. Both the genus and species were first described by Rindge in 1986.

References

Geometridae
Endemic fauna of Chile